Valeriu Munteanu (born 28 December 1980) is a Moldovan politician, who served as Minister of Environment from 2015 to 2017, member of Parliament of Moldova from 2009 to 2015 and mayor of Floreni from 2007 to 2009. He also held the position of Deputy Chairman of the Liberal Party from 2010 to 2018. He has been Chairman of Save Bessarabia Union (USB) 2019—2021. Currently, he is a vice-president of Alliance for the Union of Romanians.

Political career 
In the general local elections on June 3, 2007 he was elected mayor of his hometown, Floreni.

Since February 7, 2008 he has been a member of the Liberal Party; in 2010 he was elected as the party's vice-president. On December 11, 2018 he resigned from Liberal Party.

For the parliamentary elections of April 5, 2009, Valeriu Munteanu was ranked 37th in the list of candidates of the Liberal Party, failing to accede to Parliament. A few months later, at the early parliamentary elections in July 2009, Valeriu Munteanu was ranked 17th on the list of Liberal Party candidates, becoming a member of parliament. It was ranked 5th in the list of candidates of the Liberal Party in the parliamentary elections of 28 November 2010 and 30 November 2014, both time becoming an MP and Vice president of the Liberal Party faction will be Valeriu Munteanu.

In the 19th legislature of the parliament (2010-2014) he was the MP with most parliamentary initiatives — 113 draft normative acts submitted, like declaring Western Christmas Day Official Holiday or draft law proposing Moldova's exit from CIS. During the same period, he had the most speeches and addresses.

On 30 July 2015 he was appointed to the position of the Minister of Environment of the Republic of Moldova in the Streleţ Cabinet and was subsequently reconfirmed in the same position in the Filip Cabinet. On May 29, 2017, he resigned, following the decision of the party to leave the governing coalition.

On 21 July 2019, Munteanu was elected leader of Save Bessarabia Union (USB). In 2020, the USB joined under the leadership of Munteanu the Mișcarea Politică Unirea, a political party established for the unification of Romania and Moldova. In November 2021 political party "Save Bessarabia Union" ceased its independent activity and joined the "Alliance for the Union of Romanians". 

On 27 March 2022, Valeriu Munteanu was elected as a vice-president of Alliance for the Union of Romanians

Personal life 
Valeriu Munteanu is married to Victoria Munteanu and has four daughters: Camelia, Ilinca, Smaranda and Crăita, the latter being born in December 2014.

Awards 
 Order of the Star of Romania in the grade of Grand Cross;
 Order „Cuviosul Paisie Velicicovscki de gradul II”

References

External links 

 Valeriu Munteanu's official page on Facebook
 Liberal Party site
 Multimedia chanel on YouTube

1980 births
Liberal Party (Moldova) MPs
Living people
Moldovan MPs 2009–2010
Moldovan MPs 2010–2014
People from Anenii Noi District
Government ministers of Moldova
Moldovan MPs 2014–2018
Grand Crosses of the Order of the Star of Romania